Charles Scott Leonard IV (born October 11, 1965) is an American singer and a member of the a cappella group Rockapella, the former house band on the PBS children's geography game show Where in the World Is Carmen Sandiego?

Biography
Leonard was born and raised in Indianapolis, Indiana, and attended Lawrence North High School, where he sang in a barbershop–doo wop group. Leonard attended the University of Tampa on a baseball scholarship while studying as a voice major. After graduating in 1987, he got a job singing at Walt Disney World Resort that would also led to a similar singing job at Tokyo Disneyland in Japan for two years, where he led the Japanese electronic rock band Horizon, released a solo album, and became fluent in Japanese. Leonard returned to the United States looking for a singing job in 1990. Having seen an ad in a New York performing arts newspaper, he auditioned to be the high tenor for Rockapella and got the position in 1991, moving to New York City as a result. During Rockapella's stint as the house band on Where in the World Is Carmen Sandiego?, Leonard used his connections to the Japanese recording market to obtain a record deal for the group, resulting in seven CDs released in Japan on the ForLife Records label. Over the years, Leonard has become the front man for Rockapella; having been in the group for almost 25 years, he has been the high tenor on all but one of the official Rockapella albums/recordings  and is currently the main songwriter–arranger for Rockapella, and produces their recordings in his home recording studio, The Bungalette.

Leonard moved to Tampa, Florida, in 2001, where he lives with his wife and two children.

Discography

Solo CDs/Guest Appearances

With Rockapella

Domestic releases

International releases

Compilations

Unaffiliated releases

Various releases

References

External links

Scott Leonard Music

1965 births
Living people
Countertenors
American tenors
American male singers
Musicians from Indianapolis
Rockapella members